General Popov may refer to:

Leonid Popov (born 1945), Soviet Air Force major general
Markian Popov (1902–1969), Soviet Army general
Mikhail Popov (general) (born 1963), Bulgarian Land Forces major general
Vasili Stepanovich Popov (1743–1822), Imperial Russian Army general
Vasily Popov (Soviet general) (1894–1967), Soviet Army colonel general